Bourg-Argental is a commune in the Loire department in central France.

Population

See also
Communes of the Loire department
Ary Bitter

References

External links

Official site

Communes of Loire (department)
Forez